Peter Godfrey (born 22 October 1957) is a Scottish former professional footballer.

External links

1957 births
Living people
Scottish footballers
Footballers from Falkirk
Association football central defenders
Linlithgow Rose F.C. players
Stenhousemuir F.C. players
Livingston F.C. players
St Mirren F.C. players
Falkirk F.C. players
Arbroath F.C. players
Scottish Football League players